Grace Jethro Kavuma is a businessman, accountant, and administrator in Uganda. He is the chairman of the Capital Markets Authority of Uganda.

Background and education
Kavuma was born in the Central Region of Uganda. He graduated from Makerere University with a Bachelor of Commerce degree. He is a member of the Institute of Certified Public Accountants of Uganda and of the Institute of Certified Public Accountants of Kenya.

Career
He previously served as the chief executive officer of Tullow Uganda Limited. He has also worked at Barclays Bank of Uganda and at DFCU Bank.

See also
Uganda Securities Exchange

References

External links
 Website of Capital Markets Authority of Uganda

Living people
Date of birth missing (living people)
Ugandan businesspeople
Ganda people
Ugandan accountants
Makerere University alumni
Year of birth missing (living people)